Zhirayr or Jirair Hrayri Ananyan (Ter-Ananyan) (July 14, 1934, Berd, Armenia – April 24, 2004, Yerevan) was an Armenian playwright. He is the author of "Taxi, taxi" (1973) comedial play, one of the most populars in Armenia since 1970's. During one season it was staged in Soviet theatres more than 100 times.

Biography
Ananyan studied at Mikayel Nalbandyan school of Yerevan. He finished the historio-philological faculty of Yerevan State Pedagogical University in 1958. From 1959 to 1980 he worked at the Armenian State committee of TV and Radio. Ananyan's first play, "For a diploma" was staged in 1956. His "Andzanot amusninner", "Im tunn ko tunn che", "Karusel", "Trchogh apseits ijats marde", "Bravo" and other plays were staged at the Yerevan Sundukian theatre and Paronian theatre of comedy (including "Taxi, taxi" with Karp Khachvankyan as Knyaz and Svetlana Grigoryan as Roz).

He is one of the most popular Armenian playwrights, whose plays were translated into many languages of the world and staged in different countries, including United States, Iran, Lebanon etc. Since 1980 he was a member of the USSR Union of Writers. In 2002 he was awarded by the "Vahagn" all-Armenian prize.

Books
Taxi, taxi (plays), Yerevan, 1987
A Man from Flying Source, Yerevan, 1991

References

External links
Հուլիսի 14, Ծնունդներ, Ժիրայր Անանյան
ԺԻՐԱՅՐ ԱՆԱՆՅԱՆԻ ՊԻԵՍՆԵՐԸ՝ ՊԱՐՍԿԵՐԵՆՈՎ
ԺԻՐԱՅՐ ԱՆԱՆՅԱՆԸ ՄԵՐ ԿՈՂՔԻՆ
Ժիրայր Անանյան

20th-century Armenian writers
1934 births
People from Berd
2004 deaths
Armenian State Pedagogical University alumni
Armenian male writers